Major League Baseball has several blackout rules. Games are blacked out based on two criteria:
 A local broadcaster has priority to televise games of the team in their market over national broadcasters. For example, at one time TBS showed many Atlanta Braves games nationally and internationally in Canada. The Bally Sports regional sports networks also shows many games in other areas. If the Braves played a team that FSN or another local broadcaster showed, the local station will have the broadcast rights for its own local market, while TBS would have been blacked out in the same market for the duration of the game. A market that has a local team playing in a weekday ESPN or ESPN2 game and is shown on a local station will see ESPNEWS, or, in the past, another game scheduled on ESPN or ESPN2 at the same time (if ESPN or ESPN2 operates a regional coverage broadcasting and operates a game choice), or will be subject to an alternative programming feed. ESPN are allowed up to three "co-exists" per season for each team on Monday nights. ESPN2 does not allow co-exists of Monday night games; they will be blacked out in the home team market. MLB's streaming Internet video service is also subject to the same blackout rules, although in the near-future, MLB is rumored to be looking into the possibility of teams and their local broadcasters cutting deals with cable/satellite providers to permit in-market streaming.
 Fox has certain rights for afternoon MLB games on Saturdays, ESPN has the same rights for night games on Sundays, and starting for the 2022 season, Apple has the same rights on Friday nights for two games each Friday to stream on its Apple TV+ platform. Broadcasters cannot show games of in-market teams, regardless of whether the game is home or away, if the game of the local team has a certain start time (usually there are no other games scheduled at these times). This, at least theoretically, is to make people watch the out-of-market game on ESPN or Fox. The reasoning is that since people will not be able to watch their favorite team, they may be willing to settle for some baseball, even if it involves teams they are not as excited about. This results in higher ratings for the national broadcaster by pulling baseball fans away from watching their own team. The Braves and the Texas Rangers (and the Miami Marlins before they moved into their retractable roof stadium, Marlins Park) have traditionally been allowed to play (and televise locally) Sunday night home games during the summer to avoid the extreme heat often found in their home markets. Otherwise, teams avoid scheduling home games within the broadcast windows of the exclusive network broadcasts (i.e. teams will play at 1:00 Eastern or 7:00 local time on Saturdays). Teams are also able to play (and televise locally) makeup games in the same window.

United States

All of the Contiguous United States, except for some small, remote, isolated patches, are within at least one team's blackout territory.  Some areas may lie within the territories of two or more.  As the accompanying map shows, teams generally have exclusive territorial rights only over their home cities' immediate area, but even then there are exceptions.  For example, all of Texas, including the Houston metropolitan area as well as the Dallas/Fort Worth Metroplex, as well as the entire state of Louisiana, is within both the Astros' and Rangers' blackout areas.

Outside of the immediate area, several teams may exercise blackout rights within the same territory.  The entire state of Iowa, for example, is within the blackout areas of the Cubs, White Sox, Brewers, Twins, Cardinals, and Royals. Southern Nevada likewise lies within six MLB teams' blackout territories (Athletics, Giants, Angels, Dodgers, Padres, Diamondbacks).  Areas of far western Kansas and the Nebraska panhandle represent an anomaly; although being geographically closer to Denver than Kansas City, they are included in the blackout territory for the Royals and not the Rockies.  This is likely a remnant of pre-1993 territorial exclusions, since the Royals were the only team between Kansas City and California, except for the Astros and Rangers, between 1969 and 1992. A similar anomaly is that the El Paso area in Texas is not within the blackout territory of the Arizona Diamondbacks, despite El Paso being considerably closer to Phoenix than to either Texas-based MLB team (the New Mexico side of the El Paso area, by contrast, is within the D-Backs' blackout zone). This is also likely a remnant of territorial exclusions predating the D-Backs' 1998 entry into MLB.

MLB relies on ZIP code prefixes (the first three digits of a ZIP code) to determine its blackout areas.  For some areas in the West Valley of greater Phoenix, the ZIP code prefix is 853.  Because of this, a fan that resides within 10 miles of Chase Field will be blacked out of all online San Diego Padres games. It's likely this is a remnant of the Padres' former blackout territory; prior to the Diamondbacks' arrival, all of Arizona was included in the Padres' blackout territory.

Local broadcasts are not necessarily available in the whole blackout territory. For example, Bally Sports Wisconsin is unavailable in Iowa, so Milwaukee Brewers games are unavailable in the state.

Due to the fact that they play in Canada, the Toronto Blue Jays do not have any part of their blackout territory in the United States.

Changes due to 2012 MLB/ESPN deal
A new contract between ESPN and Major League Baseball in 2012 virtually eliminated local blackouts involving the network's Monday and Wednesday night games, allowing ESPN coverage to co-exist with that of the local broadcasters in home markets. The agreement took effect at the start of the  season.

Canada

The Toronto Blue Jays' blackout territory includes all of Canada. However, they must share British Columbia and Alberta with the Seattle Mariners, Saskatchewan and Manitoba with the Minnesota Twins, and the Maritimes with the Boston Red Sox. In the past, the province of Quebec was not included in Toronto's territory, as it belonged to the Montreal Expos exclusively. Toronto and Montreal shared all territory outside of Ontario and Quebec. Toronto Blue Jays games are aired on Sportsnet in Canada. Also, Blue Jays games broadcast nationally over-the-air on the Canadian Broadcasting Corporation television network have occasionally been subject to local blackout on CBET-TV in Windsor, Ontario, to protect the territorial rights of the Detroit Tigers across the Detroit River. No American RSNs are available on Canadian specialty television providers.

Consumer devices
Consumer devices that enable television subscribers to transmit their home television feed outside their host area to a remote location over the Internet, a practice called placeshifting, have drawn the ire of MLB. MLB's position is that subscribers who wish to watch MLB telecasts while traveling either settle for the local telecasts available or subscribe to MLB's own broadcasts for an additional fee. Consumer advocates insist the practice is legal, since the remoted content is already purchased and is merely placeshifted by the subscriber; they claim MLB is asking fans to pay twice for the same content. MLB counters that travelers utilizing placeshifting technology are undercutting the blackout rights MLB grants to local and national broadcasters, as well as MLB's own internet service.

In 2009, MLB launched MLB Network on basic cable similar to the NFL Network. As part of the new network, MLB has told owners to reduce their blackouts due to outrage amongst fans and letters pouring into MLB's offices. In particular, MLB is looking to address the availability of regional sports networks outside teams' immediate home markets. Ostensibly, if teams/channels are not available in certain locations, teams could lose their claims to such areas and coverage would be replaced by the MLB-controlled Extra Innings service.

Radio blackouts 
In MLB, there are radio blackouts. ESPN Radio has exclusive rights to the World Series and only the flagship stations of the two participating ballclubs can originate coverage, though their broadcasts are also available on Sirius XM (as of April 2021, both on satellite radio and streaming), as well as the subscription Gameday Audio package on MLB.com and MLB.tv. All other network affiliates of the two clubs must carry the ESPN Radio feed, and they may not even be able to do so if they compete with an ESPN Radio affiliate in the same market. Additionally, the two flagships must broadcast ESPN Radio national commercials during their game coverage (though they can run live commercial reads for local sponsors during broadcasts and sell ads during typically extended pre/post-game shows. WCNN, the Braves' flagship station, occasionally didn't air such national commercials and aired its normal local advertising during its coverage 2021 World Series, and also didn't credit ESPN's sponsorship). The flagship stations are also required to credit the same presenting radio sponsor of the World Series as ESPN Radio (in recent years, AutoZone). 

Additionally, radio stations (including flagships) are not allowed to broadcast any MLB games in the live Internet streams of their station programming outside of the flagship station's DMA (example: WDAE, which is the Rays Radio Network flagship, is only allowed to stream its coverage within Pasco, Pinellas, and Hillsborough counties) or on out-of-market radio affiliates that carry the station's main signal. (MLB makes its own streams of the team networks available for a fee.) Some stations will replace the game with a recorded message explaining why the game cannot be heard on their stream. Others will simply stream the station's regularly scheduled programming that is being preempted by the game. Additionally, ESPN Radio also restricts online streaming their coverage of regular season games to listeners located both within the United States and outside the markets of the teams involved in the games, regardless of application used. 

During the 2021 Postseason, the Atlanta Braves streamed its coverage of their entire postseason run completely free of geo-blocking restrictions, including their NLDS, NLCS and World Series appearances.

See also 
Syndication exclusivity

References 

Major League Baseball on television
Major League Baseball on the radio
Major League Baseball controversies